The Bookspot Literatuurprijs (previously ECI Literatuurprijs, AKO Literatuurprijs and Generale Bank Literatuurprijs) is a prize for literature in the Netherlands and Belgium. It is awarded to authors writing in Dutch and amounts to 50,000. The ceremony is televised live each year. The prize was conceived in 1986 and inaugurated the following year with the aim to promote literature and increase the public's interest in books.

Name and sponsorship

The name of the prize has not been constant, reflecting the main sponsors. It was first prefixed with AKO after its sponsor-founder, the Amsterdamsche Kiosk Onderneming, a chain of over 100 bookstores and newsstands in the Netherlands. From 1997 through 1999 it was sponsored by Belgium's Generale Bank and was named accordingly – Generale Bank Literatuurprijs. The bank was absorbed and the sponsorship presumably assumed by Fortis Bank in 1999, but the financing of the prize reverted to AKO before the 2000 award, so the name Fortis Literatuurprijs was never formally implemented. Beginning in 2015, AKO dropped sponsorship and the prize was sponsored by ECI, a book club and webshop. ECI changed its name in March 2018 to Bookspot, so the literary award had to change as well.

Selection procedure 
The Bookspot Literatuurprijs is awarded by a five-member jury of Dutch and Belgian book critics, some of whom have served on it repeatedly. The sixth person, the head of the jury, changes every year and is usually a public figure, often a politician.

The nominations follow the system of a longlist, tiplijst, of 25 preliminary nominees and a shortlist, toplijst, of six finalists. In order to be considered for a given year, a book needs to be published before the first of July of the year in which the prize is to be awarded and after 30 June of the preceding year. The winner is usually announced later in the fall.

The Bookspot award comprehends the categories fiction and non-fiction. Additionally to the jury steered Bookspot Literatuurprijs (50.000 Euro) there is a separate BookSpot Lezersprijs which enables the readers' vote and grants 10.000 Euro to the winner. The process is well-elaborated: thirty books are selected by the general jury, two longlists of 15 books in fiction and non-fiction categories, published online annually any 4 September. Any reader can vote for his favorite books. The three most chosen books form the BookSpot Lezersprijs Top 3. A separate BookSpot Lezersjury of fifty readers read those three books and elect the final Lezersprijs winner.

Winners
 1987 - J. Bernlef - Publiek geheim
 1988 - Geerten Meijsing - Veranderlijk en wisselvallig
 1989 - Brigitte Raskin - Het koekoeksjong
 1990 - Louis Ferron - Karelische nachten
 1991 - P. F. Thomése - Zuidland
 1992 - Margriet de Moor - Eerst grijs dan wit dan blauw
 1993 - Marcel Möring - Het grote verlangen
 1994 - Gerhard Durlacher - Quarantine
 1995 - Connie Palmen - De vriendschap
 1996 - Frits van Oostrom - Maerlants wereld
 1997 - A. F. Th. van der Heijden  - Onder het plaveisel het moeras
 1998 - Herman Franke - De verbeelding
 1999 - Karel Glastra van Loon - De passievrucht
 2000 - Arnon Grunberg -Fantoompijn
 2001 - Jeroen Brouwers - Geheime kamers
 2002 - Allard Schröder - De hydrograaf
 2003 - Dik van der Meulen - Multatuli: Leven en werk van Eduard Douwes Dekker
 2004 - Arnon Grunberg - The Asylum Seeker (De asielzoeker)
 2005 - Jan Siebelink - Knielen op een bed violen
 2006 - Hans Münstermann - De Bekoring
 2007 - A. F. Th. van der Heijden - Het schervengericht
 2008 - Doeschka Meijsing  - Over de liefde
 2009 - Erwin Mortier - Godenslaap
 2010 - David Van Reybrouck - Congo, een geschiedenis
 2011 - Marente de Moor - De Nederlandse maagd
 2012 - Peter Terrin - Post mortem 
 2013 - Joke van Leeuwen - Feest van het begin
 2014 - Stefan Hertmans  - Oorlog en terpentijn 
 2015 - Jeroen Brouwers - Het hout
 2016 - Martin Michael Driessen - Rivieren
 2017 - Koen Peeters - De mensengenezer
 2018 - Tommy Wieringa - De heilige Rita
 2019 - Wessel te Gussinklo - De hoogstapelaar (fiction); Sjeng Scheijen - De avant-gardisten. De Russische Revolutie in de kunst, 1917-1935 (non-fiction)
 2020 - Oek de Jong - Zwarte schuur
 2021 - Wessel te Gussinklo - Op weg naar De Hartz

References

External links
Bookspot Literatuurprijs, official website of the jury prize
BookSpot Lezersprijs, portal for readers' voting

Dutch literary awards
Awards established in 1986
Fiction awards
1986 establishments in the Netherlands